Richard Kidder Meade (July 14, 1746 – February 9, 1805) was an American army officer from Nansemond County, Virginia. He served as an aide-de-camp to General George Washington during the American Revolutionary War.

Early life
He was a son of David Meade (1700-1787), who married Susannah Everard, a daughter of Sir Richard Everard, 4th Baronet, the last Governor of North Carolina under proprietary rule. His great-great-grandfather was Richard Kidder, a noted theologian who was the Bishop of Bath and Wells.

Meade and two of his brothers were educated at Harrow, one of the oldest and most respected schools in England.

Career
In October 1775, Meade was commissioned captain of the 2nd Virginia Regiment. He led a company at the Battle of Great Bridge near Chesapeake, Virginia, arguably the first Revolutionary War battle in the state of Virginia. In March 1777, General Washington appointed him one of his aides-de-camps, with the rank of lieutenant colonel. Meade was frequently used to deliver important dispatches and orders. Alexander Hamilton did the "head work" for Washington while he did the riding. He was with Washington during all of the major battles between 1777 and 1780, and supervised the execution of Major John Andre. In November 1780, he left Washington's staff to get married for the second time. While in Virginia he aided General von Steuben in repelling an attack of British forces under Benedict Arnold.

Personal life
Meade's first wife was Elizabeth Randolph, a daughter of Richard Randolph, but none of their children survived her. On December 10, 1780, he married his second wife, Mary Grymes Randolph, the widow of William Randolph of Chatsworth, Virginia. They had 4 daughters and 4 sons, including William Meade, who became the third Episcopal Bishop of Virginia. His daughter Ann Randolph Meade Page was an Episcopal slavery reformer.

He bought a large tract of land in White Post, Virginia in the 1780s, and expanded an existing log cabin into "Meadea." About 1791, he built the nearby brick house "Lucky Hit."  Both are listed on the National Register of Historic Places.

He died in 1805 apparently from the effects of gout and years of military life.

Richard Kidder Meade Jr. (1803-1862), a U.S. Representative from Virginia, was the son of a cousin of the same name, Richard Kidder Meade (1775-1832).

See also
 Randolph family of Virginia
 First Families of Virginia

References

1746 births
1805 deaths
People educated at Harrow School
Continental Army officers from Virginia
Aides-de-camp of George Washington
People from Clarke County, Virginia
Meade family of Virginia
People from Nansemond County, Virginia
Randolph family of Virginia